Jack Alexander Huston (born 7 December 1982) is a British actor. He appeared as Richard Harrow in the HBO television drama series Boardwalk Empire. He also had a supporting role in the 2013 film American Hustle, portrayed the eponymous Ben-Hur in the 2016 historical drama, and appeared as one of the main characters in the fourth season of the FX anthology series Fargo (2020). In 2023, he starred in the supernatural television series Mayfair Witches.

Early life and ancestry
Huston was born on 7 December 1982 in King's Lynn, Norfolk, the son of Lady Margot Lavinia (née Cholmondeley) and actor, assistant director and writer Tony Huston. Huston decided to become an actor at the age of 6, after playing the title role in a school production of Peter Pan. He later attended Hurtwood House, a drama institute.

His mother is English and his father is American. His paternal aunt is actress Anjelica Huston, and his paternal half-uncle is actor Danny Huston. His paternal grandparents were American director John Huston (who became an Irish citizen) and model/dancer Enrica Soma, and his maternal grandparents were The 6th Marquess of Cholmondeley and Lavinia Margaret (née Leslie). Huston is the nephew of The 7th Marquess of Cholmondeley. On his father's side, he has Italian, Irish, Scottish, Scotch-Irish, Welsh, and English ancestry, and is a great-grandson of Canadian actor Walter Huston. 

Through his maternal grandfather's father, The 5th Marquess of Cholmondeley, Huston is descended from Sir Robert Walpole, the first Prime Minister of the Kingdom of Great Britain. Jack's maternal grandfather's mother, Sybil, Marchioness of Cholmondeley, was from a Jewish family (from Iraq, India, and Germany); through Sybil, Jack is descended from both David Sassoon, the Treasurer of Baghdad, and Mayer Amschel Rothschild, who founded the Rothschild family international banking dynasty.

Career
Huston started his film career with a small screen adaptation of Spartacus, where he played Flavius. He then went on to having more prominent roles in such films as Factory Girl, playing the American poet Gerard Malanga, the horror film Shrooms, Outlander and Shrink.

In 2010, he played the minor role of Royce King in The Twilight Saga: Eclipse. He appeared in HBO's Boardwalk Empire as Richard Harrow, a severely disfigured World War I marksman turned gangster. On 16 December 2010, it was announced Huston would be made a series regular after appearing in five episodes of the first season.

After this he went on to be directed by Al Pacino in the 2011 film Wilde Salome and to having starring roles in Not Fade Away, Two Jacks and Night Train to Lisbon. In 2012, he played the part of narrator on avant-garde musician John Zorn's album A Vision in Blakelight, an homage to William Blake. 

In 2013, he appeared in David O. Russell's comedy-drama American Hustle, as Pete Musane. Later that year, Huston played Charles Bruno in Strangers on a Train at London's Gielgud Theatre. In 2019 Huston played Bobby Kennedy in the Martin Scorsese film The Irishman.

In 2020, he had a supporting role in the fourth season of the FX black comedy crime drama Fargo as Odis Weff, a corrupt Kansas City police detective with severe OCD.

Personal life

Huston began dating American model Shannan Click in 2011. They have two children: a daughter (born 2013) and a son (born 2016).

Filmography

Film

Television

References

External links

 Interview with Jack Huston in Details

1982 births 
Living people
21st-century English male actors
British expatriate male actors in the United States
English male film actors
English male stage actors
English male television actors
English male voice actors
English people of American descent
English people of Canadian descent
English people of Irish descent
English people of Italian descent
English people of Scottish descent
English people of Ulster-Scottish descent
British people of Iraqi-Jewish descent
English people of Welsh descent
British people of German-Jewish descent
British people of Jewish descent
Male actors from London
Actors from Norfolk
People educated at Hurtwood House
People educated at Millfield Preparatory School
Outstanding Performance by a Cast in a Motion Picture Screen Actors Guild Award winners
Jack